"Winning Days" is the third and final single from the album of the same name by the Vines. It appeared on the ARIA Singles Chart top 100 and the top 50 on the UK Singles Chart.

Track listing

Charts

References 

The Vines (band) songs
2004 singles
2004 songs
EMI Records singles
Songs written by Craig Nicholls